Club Seven is an early United States television series, which aired from 12 August 1948 to 1951 on ABC. Some episodes were 30 minutes, while others were 15 minutes.

Overview
The series was a live television variety show set in a mock nightclub. Featured were Tony Bavaar, Bobby Byrne, and Johnny Thompson.

The concept was also used by several other early television series. The Morey Amsterdam Show (1948-1949 on CBS, 1949-1950 on DuMont) was also a variety series set at a night club, as was The Ilona Massey Show (1954-1955, DuMont). Additionally, Hold That Camera (1950, DuMont), Café de Paris (1949, DuMont), Chez Paree Revue (1950, DuMont) and the British series Café Continental (1947–1953, BBC) were variety series set in nightclubs or restaurants.

Early Australian variety series Cafe Continental (1958-1961, ABC) was also set in a restaurant, along with The Late Show (HSV-7, 1957-1959), and unrelated series Club Seven (1959-1961, HSV-7). Another Australian series, Rendezvous at Romano's (TCN-9, 1957) may have also featured such a setting. Early Canadian series Nightcap also used the cabaret concept.

Episode status
A single 30-minute episode from 1949 is held by the UCLA Film and Television Archive, featuring Lord Buckley as the guest star.

See also
1948-49 United States network television schedule (Thursdays at 8:30pm ET, 30 minutes)
1949-50 United States network television schedule (Mondays thru Fridays at 7:15pm ET, 15 minutes)
1950-51 United States network television schedule (Mondays thru Fridays at 7pm ET, 30 minutes)

References

External links
Club Seven at IMDB
1948 American television series debuts
1951 American television series endings
American Broadcasting Company original programming
Black-and-white American television shows
1940s American variety television series
1950s American variety television series
English-language television shows